Teinolophidae is an extinct family of small, carnivorous mammals that were the earliest known monotremes and were endemic to what would become Australia. Two genera are known: Teinolophos, and possibly also Stirtodon. 

Teinolophos is deeply divergent within monotreme evolution, so Flannery et al. (2022) proposed to move it into its own family, Teinolophidae, and Stirtodon was also tentatively assigned to Teinolophidae in the same paper.

The skulls of the two teinolophids differed from modern monotremes. Among the contrasts are that, unlike modern monotremes, the teinolophids lacked beaks, and the teinolophids had their ear bones connected to the jaw via the Meckel's cartilage, while modern monotremes have suspended ear bones much like placentals and marsupials.

References

Prehistoric mammal families
Early Cretaceous first appearances
Cretaceous mammals of Australia
Fossils of Australia
Taxa named by Tom Rich